The Big Idea is the fifth and last of five short films starring Ted Healy and His Stooges (Moe Howard, Larry Fine and Curly Howard) released by Metro-Goldwyn-Mayer on May 12, 1934.

Production
Like other shorts Healy and the Stooges filmed at MGM, stock footage was utilized to fill out the 20 minutes of time. For The Big Idea, MGM used musical numbers edited out of the feature films Dancing Lady (1933), which ironically had a supporting role by Healy and a cameo by the Stooges, and Going Hollywood (1933).

This is one of the last films and the fifth and final musical-comedy short subject in which the Three Stooges appeared with longtime partner Ted Healy. By the time of the release of The Big Idea, the Three Stooges had signed a new contract with Columbia Pictures to do a series of comedy short films without Healy, beginning with Woman Haters (1934).

See also
The Three Stooges filmography

References

External links

The Big Idea at threestooges.net
The Big Idea on Dailymotion

1934 films
Metro-Goldwyn-Mayer short films
The Three Stooges films
American black-and-white films
1934 musical comedy films
American musical comedy films
Films directed by William Beaudine
1930s English-language films
1930s American films